The Jains in India are the last direct representatives of the ancient Shramana tradition. People who practice Jainism, an ancient religion of the Indian subcontinent, are collectively referred to as Jains.

Sangha

Jainism has a fourfold order of muni (male monastics), aryika (female monastics), Śrāvaka (layman) and sravika (laywoman). This order is known as a sangha.. Many Jains are in general caste.

Cultural influence
The Jain have the highest literacy rate in India, 94.1.% compared with the national average of 65.38%. They have the highest female literacy rate, 90.6.% compared with the national average of 54.16%.

As per national survey NFHS-4 conducted in 2018 Jains were declared wealthiest of any community with 70% of their population living in top quintiles of wealth.
The sex ratio in the 0-6 age group is the second lowest for Jain (870 females per 1,000 males).

Communities
Jains are found in almost every part of India. There are about 1122 different Jain communities in India. They can be divided into six groups based on historical and current residence:

Central India
 Jainism in Bundelkhand
 Jainism in Madhya Pradesh

Western India
 Jainism in Gujarat (Gujarati Jain)
 Jainism in Maharashtra (Marathi Jain)
 Jainism in Mumbai

Northern India
 Jainism in Delhi
 Jainism in Uttar Pradesh
 Jainism in Rajasthan (Marwari Jain)

Southern India
 Jainism in Karnataka
 Jainism in Kerala
 Jainism in North Karnataka
 Jainism in Tamil Nadu (Tamil Jain)

Eastern India
 Jainism in Bengal
 Jainism in Nagaland

Diaspora
Virchand Gandhi made a presentation of Jainism at the Parliament of the World's Religions in Chicago in 1893, marking one of the earliest appearances of Jainism outside India. The World Jain Congress was held in Leicester in 1988.
 Jainism in Europe
 Jainism in Canada
 Jainism in the United States
 Jainism in East Africa - One of the oldest Jain overseas diaspora. Their number was estimated at 45,000 at the independence of the East African countries in the early 1960s. Most members of the diaspora belonged to Gujarati speaking Halari Visa Oshwal Jain community originally from the Jamnagar area of Saurashtra.
Jainism in West Africa - Nigerian Jains
Jains are one of the oldest religious and cultural groups, originating in India. Although small in number, there are many subcommunities of Jains such as Tamil Jains, Gujarati Jains etc. One of the lesser known groups are the Nigerian Jains.

Originally emigrating from South Indian from Valparai, a small Tamil village, due to discrimination against their darker skin tone; they eventually settled in Lagos. Thus, the Nigerian Jain is in fact an offshoot of the even lesser known Tamil Jain. There, in Nigeria, they flourished and built a small but stable community. However, being perceived as outsiders (due to their restrictive diet and limited stature), they grew increasing insular and withdrawn from the wider Jain community and other Nigerians.

Clashes with Nigerian government: In 1982, the Jain community clashed with Nigerian authorities over the lack of provisions for vegetarians in Lagos. The Jains believed that eating roots vegetables and meat was morally wrong, which were both staples of Nigerian cuisine. They asked for farming land to graze cows and grow aubergines (which they believed to be the vegetable with the least emotions). They were given a small farm away from the city, and thus were ostracized.

Medical issues: Due to their small community and close relations, several generations along many Nigerian jains had conserved several recessive genes. This was phenotypically seen as short stature, Valgus of the knees and thoracic kyphosis resulting in a "T-rex walk". Due to the small gene pool, Dorothea Bennett actually travelled to Lagos as part of her work on developmental genomics.

Population
The Jain population in India according to 2011 census is 0.54% i.e. 4,451,753 (Males 2,278,097; Females 2,173,656) out of the total population of India 1,210,854,977 (males 623,270,258; females 587,584,719). The tabular representation of Jain population in the major states of India as per 2011 Census data released by the government is:

It is likely that the actual population of Jains may be significantly higher than the census numbers.

The Jain population in United States is estimated to be about 150,000 to 200,000.

In Japan, there are more than 5,000 families who have converted to Jainism and is growing faster there.

See also
 Legal status of Jainism as a distinct religion in India
 List of Jains
 Sarak

References

Citations

Sources
 
 
 
 
 Facets of Jainology : Selected Research Papers on Jain Society, Religion and Culture/Vilas Adinath Sangave. Mumbai, Popular Prakashan, 2001

External links
Hukonchu.com - resource for Jain literature and religious information
"Jainism in America" by Yashwant K. Malaiya
Jain Jagruti Centre, Toronto
Jain Temple at Palitana, Gujarat - Vidhya Vihaar

 
Social groups of India
Social groups of Gujarat
Social groups of West Bengal
Social groups of Rajasthan
Social groups of Kerala
Social groups of Karnataka
Social groups of Maharashtra
Social groups of Delhi
Social groups of Tamil Nadu